The Owl vs Bombo (also known as The Owl vs Bumbo and The Owl and Dumbo) is a 1984 Hong Kong action comedy film starring and directed by Sammo Hung, who also produced. The film co-stars George Lam and Deanie Ip.

It is Michelle Yeoh's first film credit (as "Michelle Khan").

Cast
 Sammo Hung as "Bombo" First-Day Chan
 George Lam as "Owl" Wong Yan-fu
 Deannie Ip as Joyce Leung
 Michelle Khan as Ms. Yeung
 Season Ma as Bonnie Leung
 Stanley Fung as Chung / Inspector Fung
 Philip Chan as Superintendent
 Wu Ma as Waiter
 Ronald Wong as Chan Chi-ming
 Cheung King-po as Wah / Inspector Lui
 James Tien as Au Gung
 Fung King-man as Au Gung's lieutenant
 Dick Wei as Au Gung's Man
 Tai San as Au Gung's Man
 Tai Po as Gang Member
 Huang Ha as Gang Member
 San Kuai as Gang Member
 Billy Chan as Gang Member
 Sham Chin-po as Gang Member
 Wellson Chin as Gang Member
 Yuen Miu as Gang Member
 Lee Chi-kit as Gang Member
 Hon Yee-sang as One of Owl's Accomplices
 Yat-poon Chai as One of Owl's Accomplices
 Teddy Yip as Waiter
 Charlie Cho as Bank Manager
 Chin Kar-lok as Thug in Alley
 Johnny Cheung as Thug in Alley
 Lau Chau-sang as Thug
 Yam Ho as Brother Lun
 Tsang Choh-lam as Waiter
 Ng Min-kan as cop
 Lee Fat-yuen as Big Head
 Chow Kam-kong as Security Guard at Bank
 Ka Lee as Bank employee
 Cheung Chi-ban as Lawyer Chow
 Hui Ying-sau as Uncle Choy
 Sam Wong as Student
 Timothy Zao as Student
 Chu Wing-tong as Student
 Joey Leung - Student

References

External links 

1984 films
1984 martial arts films
1980s action comedy films
1980s buddy comedy films
1980s Cantonese-language films
Films directed by Sammo Hung
Films set in 1981
Films shot in Hong Kong
Hong Kong action comedy films
Hong Kong buddy films
Hong Kong martial arts comedy films
Kung fu films
1980s Hong Kong films